Roman Grey was a Canadian band from the 1980s. Their music has been described as "dream pop".

History
Roman Grey was formed in 1982 by Ross Roman and David Grey. Their first self-titled EP release on Relativity Records became popular in Italy, and the single "Look Me in the Eyes" was played extensively on the radio and in dance clubs there.

The band found success in Canada with their 1988 album Edge of the Shadow, produced by Terry Brown. The single "IBU" appeared on the RPM Canadian Content charts that year.

Discography

Studio albums
 Edge of the Shadow (1988)

Extended plays
 Roman Grey (1982)
 Body Shock (1984)

Singles
 "Look Me in the Eyes" (1982)
 "Shake Down" (1984)
 "Shangri-La" (1988)
 "I.B.U." (1988) #37 CA

References

1982 establishments in Canada
Canadian alternative rock groups
Canadian synthpop groups
Musical groups established in 1982